Suresh D. Deo (born 20 March 1946) is an Indian former cricket umpire. He stood in one ODI game in 1996.

See also
 List of One Day International cricket umpires

References

1946 births
Living people
Indian One Day International cricket umpires
Place of birth missing (living people)